A significant and deadly severe weather event that affected the Southeastern United States on March 3, 2019. Over the course of 6 hours, a total of 41 tornadoes touched down across portions of Alabama, Georgia, Florida, and South Carolina. The strongest of these was an EF4 tornado that devastated rural communities from Beauregard, Alabama, through Smiths Station, Alabama to Talbotton, Georgia, killing 23 people and injuring at least 100 others. Its death toll represented more than twice the number of tornado deaths in the United States in 2018 as well as the deadliest single tornado in the country since the 2013 Moore EF5 tornado. An EF3 tornado also destroyed residences to the east of Tallahassee in Leon County, Florida, and was only the second tornado of that strength in the county since 1945. Several other strong tornadoes occurred across the region throughout the evening of March 3 and caused significant damage. A large number of EF0 and EF1 tornadoes also touched down.

Meteorological synopsis
On February 28, the Storm Prediction Center (SPC) issued a day four risk for severe thunderstorms across a broad region of the Southeast United States stretching from northern Louisiana through northwestern Georgia. A broad slight risk was introduced the following day, and a more narrow enhanced risk was raised across portions of southeastern Alabama and southwestern Georgia later on March 2 where the threat for tornadoes, some potentially strong, appeared most likely.

The severe weather prediction for March 3 came to fruition that morning as a broad mid-level cyclone in the northern jet stream pushed eastward over northern Ontario and James Bay. A series of shortwave troughs rotated around the southern semicircle of this low-pressure system, with an especially well-defined shortwave progressing from the South Central United States eastward across the Appalachian Mountains and into the Atlantic Ocean. This feature led to the formation of a surface low over northern Mississippi and Alabama, aiding in the northern transport of rich and deep moisture originating from the Gulf of Mexico. Strong southwesterly low-level winds coupled with strong forcing for ascent along a trailing cold front led to the formation of a squall line stretching from the Carolinas down into portions of the Deep South. Ahead of this line, the combination of mid-level Convective Available Potential Energy of 500–1,200 J/kg, a low-level jet of 50–70 kn, and effective storm-relative helicity of 250–400 J/kg resulted in a highly unstable atmosphere that was conducive to the formation of strong tornadoes. The lack of strong convective inhibition, coupled with weak forcing, favored the formation of numerous discrete supercell thunderstorms across the Florida Panhandle, southeastern Alabama, much of central Georgia, and into South Carolina. Throughout the afternoon, numerous supercell thunderstorms that formed ahead of the squall line produced several significant and damaging tornadoes, including the long-tracked violent EF4 tornado that struck Beauregard and Smiths Station, Alabama as well as Talbotton, Georgia. As the squall line moved eastward, embedded circulations and semi-discrete structures within the line produced additional strong tornadoes before tornadic activity waned with eastward progression overnight.

Confirmed tornadoes

March 3 event

Beauregard–Smiths Station, Alabama/Talbotton, Georgia

This violent, deadly, and long-tracked wedge tornado touched down in eastern Macon County, Alabama, just northeast of US 80 (SR 8) and near the Lee County line. Initially a weak tornado, it snapped tree limbs and uprooted trees at EF0 to EF1 intensity as it moved east northeastward. Crossing into Lee County, EF1 damage was observed as additional trees were downed and a poorly constructed church had its roof blown off and sustained collapse of two unreinforced cinder block exterior walls. Widening into a large wedge tornado, it intensified to EF2 strength as it crossed County Road 11, where numerous large trees were snapped and denuded. A house and two storage sheds had sheet metal peeled off and scattered into a treeline. The tornado continued to intensify dramatically as it crossed Cave Mill Road and County Road 39, reaching its peak intensity of low-end EF4 and producing widespread, devastating damage as it impacted the southern part of Beauregard. A massive swath of large trees in this area was completely mowed down and debarked, and numerous manufactured homes were thrown and obliterated, with debris scattered in all directions and the metal frames of several of these homes being twisted around trees or never recovered. The most intense damage was inflicted to a well-built, anchor-bolted brick home that was leveled with a portion of the slab foundation swept clean of debris. Several block-foundation frame homes were leveled or swept completely away in this area, and windrowing of debris was noted. Multiple vehicles were lofted through the air and mangled beyond recognition, including one car that was wrapped around a tree. A large semi-truck was flipped over and wrapped around the base of a tree as well, a high-tension power line tower was toppled, and a few homes farther away from the center of the damage path had their roofs ripped off.

Continuing to the east-northeast, the tornado weakened to EF3 strength as it crossed SR 51 and struck the small neighboring community of Dupree. Many additional manufactured homes were completely destroyed with debris strewn downwind, numerous trees were snapped and debarked, and frame homes sustained total roof and exterior wall loss in this area. The tornado moved slightly north of due east, crossing Lee County Road 100 and Lee County Road 166, snapping numerous trees as it weakened further to high-end EF2 strength. A well-anchored manufactured home in this area was ripped from its foundation and blown  but remained mostly intact. A frame home had major roof damage, windows blown out, and a few exterior walls ripped off. Crossing County Road 165 and County Road 40, high-end EF2 damage continued as a house lost its roof and exterior walls, another home had much of its roof torn off, several manufactured homes were damaged or destroyed, and many trees were snapped. Farther along the path, low-end EF2 damage was observed to the west of SR 169, where numerous trees were snapped and a few structures at the periphery of the damage path sustained minor impacts. Further weakening occurred as the tornado crossed and continued to the east of SR 169, downing trees at EF1 intensity.

The tornado began to strengthen again just east-northeast of this location, reaching EF2 intensity as it crossed County Road 245. A house lost much of its roof, and another home sustained less severe damage in this area as well. The tornado then crossed County Road 179 and entered the town of Smiths Station at high-end EF2 strength. In Smiths Station, multiple small and poorly constructed frame homes lost their roofs and exterior walls, a bar and music venue sustained major structural damage, a gas station sustained moderate damage, and numerous trees were downed. East of town, EF2 damage continued as two metal transmission towers were knocked down, homes were damaged, and many large trees were snapped and/or uprooted, including several that landed on structures and caused major damage.

Crossing the Chattahoochee River, the tornado exited Alabama and entered Muscogee County, Georgia, moving through sparsely populated areas and downing numerous trees at EF1 strength before crossing I-185 (SR 411). As the tornado and passed between Barin and Fortson, a small area of low-end EF3 damage was noted as a large cell tower was toppled over and mangled along US 27 (SR 1). Several one inch in diameter metal guide wires were snapped at this location, and a nearby swath of trees was flattened to the ground. Numerous additional trees were downed at EF1 strength as the tornado moved into Harris County and passed south of Ellerslie. Multiple homes sustained mostly shingle and carport damage in this area, though one home sustained considerable damage to its attic and second floor. Paralleling and eventually crossing SR 315, the tornado reached EF2 strength as countless trees were snapped or uprooted, and a house sustained major damage to its second floor. Further intensification occurred as the tornado entered Talbot County and again reached low-end EF3 intensity as it struck the rural community of Baughville, where the Humble Zion Church was destroyed. The church was completely flattened, but was not anchored to its foundation. Another church in this area was also destroyed, along with a mobile home. A two-story frame home also sustained severe damage.

The tornado briefly weakened to high-end EF1 strength past Baughville, downing many trees in heavily forested areas. Once again regaining low-end EF3 strength, the tornado proceeded to strike the north side of Talbotton, causing major damage in town. Numerous manufactured homes were obliterated, with debris being scattered up to a quarter mile away through nearby woods. Multiple other manufactured homes were badly damaged. Vehicles were piled atop each other and damaged by flying debris, and an unanchored brick duplex was swept from its foundation and leveled, leaving only the foundation slab and a pile of debris behind. Continuing to the east-northeast past Talbotton, a manufactured home was rolled and destroyed. Mostly EF1 damage was observed beyond this point, though a final area of EF2 tree damage occurred in a small valley near the concurrent US 80 and SR 540. Hundreds of trees were snapped off at the base in this area before the tornado began to rapidly weaken and shrink in size. A few more trees were snapped near the intersection of George Smith Rd and Carl Mathis Rd before the tornado dissipated.

There were 23 people killed by this violent tornado, with all of the fatalities occurring in Lee County, Alabama; 90 others were injured, some critically. This was the first violent (EF4 or EF5) tornado in the United States since April 29, 2017 and the deadliest since the 2013 Moore tornado. It was also the first violent tornado in Lee County since 1875 and the first deadly tornado to strike Lee County since 1953.

Non-tornadic impacts 
The cold section of the tornado outbreak produced a snowstorm across much of the United States. In Colorado,  of snow fell at Estes Park and  fell at Denver International Airport.  of snow fell in Squaw Valley, California. As the storm tracked eastward, snow was wreaking havoc on parts of the Four Corner States and the Midwest, closing roads and cancelling over 700 flights. Shaping up to be much more intense than the first storm for the US Northeast, The National Weather Service issued winter storm warnings from West Virginia to Maine. Closer to the Atlantic coast a mix of rain and snow affected major cities such as Baltimore, Philadelphia, and New York City, although in Boston, snowfall totals were over a foot even along the ocean. Almost 60,000 customers in the Northeast lost power.

Aftermath

Twenty-three deaths occurred as a result of a single tornado that moved through Lee County, Alabama. A majority of the deaths occurred in and around the small Alabama town of Beauregard. Four of the dead were children. Ten of the victims were from one family. Sixty patients were received at the East Alabama Medical Center; however, only four remained hospitalized on March 4. Many people were initially reported as missing. Drones with heat-seeking devices were utilized in the search effort for survivors while ground crews had to wait for morning light on March 4. In a later report on March 6, all tornado victims in Alabama have been accounted for.

See also
 List of United States tornadoes from January to March 2019
 List of North American tornadoes and tornado outbreaks

Notes

References

External links
Outbreak summaries from regional National Weather Service offices:
Birmingham, Alabama, WFO
Atlanta, Georgia, WFO
Columbia, South Carolina, WFO
Charleston, South Carolina, WFO

Tornado 2019-03-20
Tornado 2019-03-20
Tornado 2019-03-20
Tornado 2019-03-20
Tornado 2019-03-20
F4 tornadoes by date
Tornado 2019-03-20
Tornadoes of 2019
Tornadoes in Alabama
Tornadoes in Florida
Tornadoes in Georgia (U.S. state)
Tornadoes in South Carolina